Xylobium, abbreviated Xyl in horticultural trade, is a genus of plants in family Orchidaceae. It contains about 35 species native to tropical America.

References

External links 

Maxillariinae genera
Maxillariinae